Daniel 'Dani' Fernández Navarro (born 29 January 1987 in Alcoy, Alcoià, Valencian Community) is a Spanish footballer who plays for L'Olleria CF as a midfielder.

External links

1987 births
Living people
People from Alcoy
Sportspeople from the Province of Alicante
Spanish footballers
Footballers from the Valencian Community
Association football midfielders
Segunda División players
Segunda División B players
Tercera División players
CD Alcoyano footballers
Ontinyent CF players
CF Gandía players